Gene Curtis Harrington (September 17, 1926 – May 6, 2007) was an American film and television director whose work included experimental films, horror films and epidoes of television series. He is considered one of the forerunners of New Queer Cinema.

Life and career

Early life
Harrington was born on September 17, 1926 in Los Angeles, the son of Isabel (Dorum) and Raymond Stephen Harrington. He grew up in Beaumont, California. His first cinematic endeavors were amateur films he made while still a teenager. He attended Occidental College and the University of Southern California, then graduated from the University of California, Los Angeles with a degree in film studies.

Career beginnings
He began his career as a film critic, writing a book on Josef von Sternberg in 1948. He directed several avant-garde short films in the 1940s and 1950s, including Fragment of Seeking, Picnic, and The Wormwood Star (a film study of the artwork of Marjorie Cameron which was filmed at the home of multi-millionaire art collector Edward James). Cameron also co-starred in his subsequent film Night Tide (1961) with Dennis Hopper. Harrington worked with Kenneth Anger, serving as a cinematographer on Anger's Puce Moment and acting in Inauguration of the Pleasure Dome (1954) (he played Cesare, the somnambulist). Harrington had links to Thelema shared with his close associates Kenneth Anger and Marjorie Cameron who frequently acted in his films. One of Harrington's mentors was avant-garde film pioneer Maya Deren, an initiated voodoo priestess.

Harrington was the driving force in rediscovering the original James Whale version of The Old Dark House (1932, Universal Pictures). Although the rights to the original story had been sold to Columbia Pictures for a remake, he persuaded George Eastman House to preserve it. On the Kino International DVD, there is a filmed interview of Harrington's explaining why and how this came about (the contract stipulated that they were allowed to save the film only, not release it, essentially to prove that there was no profit motive). Harrington was an advisor on Bill Condon's Gods and Monsters (1998), about the last days of director James Whale, and Harrington had known Whale at the end of his life. Harrington also has a cameo in the film.

Roger Corman assigned Harrington to direct two American films and use footage from Russian science-fiction films in both; the result was Voyage to the Prehistoric Planet (1965) and Queen of Blood (1966), which led to further films such as Games (1967).

He also directed Whoever Slew Auntie Roo? (1971) with Shelley Winters, What's the Matter with Helen? (1971) with Winters and Debbie Reynolds, and Killer Bees (1974) with Gloria Swanson in one of her later roles.

Harrington made two television movies based on screenplays by Robert Bloch: The Cat Creature (1973) and The Dead Don't Die (1975).

Later films
Harrington had a cameo in Orson Welles's unfinished The Other Side of the Wind (1970–1976). Throughout the 1970s and 1980s, Harrington directed episodes of television series such as Baretta, Dynasty, Wonder Woman, The Twilight Zone and Charlie's Angels.

Harrington's final film, the short Usher, is a remake of Fall of the House of Usher, an unreleased film he did while in high school. He cast of Nikolas and Zeena Schreck in his updated version of Edgar Allan Poe's "The Fall of the House of Usher". Financing of the film was partly accomplished through the Shrecks' brokering of the sale of Harrington's signed copy of Crowley's The Book of Thoth.

The Academy Film Archive has preserved several of Curtis Harrington's films, including Night Tide, On the Edge, and Picnic.

Personal life
Harrington was homosexual. He wrote in his autobiography that he had his first sexual experience with another male (a football player) in high school.

Death
Harrington died on May 6, 2007 of complications from a stroke he suffered in 2005. His remains are interred in the Cathedral Mausoleum at the Hollywood Forever Cemetery.

House of Harrington, a short documentary about the director's life, was released in 2008. It was directed by Jeffrey Schwarz and Tyler Hubby and filmed several years before Harrington's death. It includes footage of his high school film Fall of the House of Usher.

Curtis Harrington's memoir Nice Guys Don't Work in Hollywood was published in 2013 by Drag City.

Filmography

Short films
 Fall of the House of Usher (1942)
 Fragment of Seeking (1946)
 Picnic (1948)
 On the Edge (1949)
 The Assignation (1952)
 Dangerous Houses (1952), unreleased
 St. Tropaz (1952), unfinished
 The Wormwood Star (1956), documentary about Marjorie Cameron
 The Four Elements (1966), industrial short
 Usher (2000)

Theatrical films
 Night Tide (1961, not released widely until 1963)
 Voyage to the Prehistoric Planet (1965)
 Queen of Blood (1966)
 Games (1967)
 What's the Matter with Helen? (1971)
 Whoever Slew Auntie Roo? (1971)
 The Killing Kind (1973)
 Ruby (1977)
 Mata Hari (1985)

TV movies
 How Awful About Allan (1970)
 The Cat Creature (1973)
 Killer Bees (1974)
 The Dead Don't Die (1975)
 Devil Dog: The Hound of Hell (1978)

TV series
The Legend of Jesse James (1966), 2 episodes
Baretta (1975–76), 2 episodes
Quinn Martin's Tales of the Unexpected (1977), 1 episode ("A Hand For Sonny Blue")
Logan's Run (1978), 1 episode
Lucan (1978), 1 episode
Sword of Justice (1978, 1 episode
Vega$ (1978), 1 episode
Charlie's Angels (1978–79), 2 episodes
Wonder Woman (1979), 1 episode
Darkroom (1981), 2 episodes and opening credits
Hotel (1983–84), 2 episodes
Dynasty (1983–85), 6 episodes
Glitter (1984), 1 episode
The Colbys (1985–87), 5 episodes
The Twilight Zone (1987, 1 episode

Acting roles
The Fall of the House of Usher (1942)
 Fragment of Seeking (1946)
Inauguration of the Pleasure Dome (1954)
Ironside (1967), episode "Let My Brother Go"
The Other Side of the Wind (1972)
Gods and Monsters (1998)
Usher (2000)

References

External links

Retrospective in Terror: An Interview with Curtis Harrington
Terrortrap.com Gallery
Curtis Harrington Facebook Page
Variety Obituary
Curtis Harrington papers, Margaret Herrick Library, Academy of Motion Picture Arts and Sciences

1926 births
2007 deaths
American experimental filmmakers
LGBT film directors
LGBT television directors
Burials at Hollywood Forever Cemetery
Film directors from Los Angeles
Occidental College alumni
University of Southern California alumni
UCLA Film School alumni
Horror film directors
20th-century American LGBT people
21st-century American LGBT people